Clifford Johnston Vogelsang (November 20, 1892 – May 8, 1933) was an American lawyer and businessman.

Vogelsang was born in El Paso, Illinois. He graduated from Illinois Wesleyan University and was admitted to the Illinois bar. Vogelsang practiced law in Pana, Illinois and then moved to Taylorville, Illinois where he continued to practice law. Vogelsang served as county judge for Christian County, Illinois. He was a Democrat. Vogelsang served in the Illinois Senate in 1933 and died while in office. He died in St. Vincent's Hospital in Taylorville, Illinois from complications from surgery for the removal of his appendix.

Notes

External links

1892 births
1933 deaths
People from El Paso, Illinois
People from Taylorville, Illinois
Illinois Wesleyan University alumni
Illinois lawyers
Illinois state court judges
Democratic Party Illinois state senators
20th-century American politicians
20th-century American judges
20th-century American lawyers